The Statute of Merton or Provisions of Merton (Latin: Provisiones de Merton, or Stat. Merton), sometimes also known as the Ancient Statute of Merton, was a statute passed by the Parliament of England in 1235 during the reign of Henry III. It is considered to be the first English statute, and is printed as the first statute in The Statutes of the Realm. Containing 11 chapters, the terms of the statute were agreed at Merton between Henry and the barons of England in 1235. It was another instance, along with Magna Carta twenty years previously, of the struggle between the barons and the king to limit the latter's rights.

Amongst its provisions, the statute allowed a Lord of the Manor to enclose common land provided that sufficient pasture remained for his tenants, and set out when and how manorial lords could assert rights over waste land, woods, and pastures against their tenants. It quickly became a basis for English common law, developing and clarifying legal concepts of ownership, and was one of the English statutes carried over into the law of the Lordship of Ireland.

Having long been disused, it was revived under Duke of Northumberland John Dudley in January 1550 to enable lords to enclose their land at their own discretion, out of keeping with the traditional Tudor anti-enclosure attitude.

The Statute also dealt with illegitimacy – stating that "He is a bastard that is born before the marriage of his parents". It also dealt with women's rights – dowries ("A woman shall recover damages in a writ of dower"), and widows' right to bequeath land ("Widows may bequeath the crop of their lands").

Chapter 4 of this statute was the Commons Act 1236.

Chapters 1 and 2 and 9 were repealed for the Republic of Ireland by section 8 of, and Part I of Schedule 2 to, the Succession Act, 1965, subject to the savings in section 9 of that Act. The whole statute was repealed for that Republic by section 1 of, and Part 2 of the Schedule to, the Statute Law Revision Act 1983.

Dating and nomenclature
The statute was passed in 1235 and is named after Merton, where it was passed. It is considered the first English statute. Magna Carta was initially enacted in 1215 and is counted as a statute by some sources as early as 1225; however, The Statutes of the Realm does not consider it as a statute prior to a 1297 confirmation. The Charter of the Forest had been passed in 1217 but is not considered a statute.

Extracts 

 A woman shall recover damages in a writ of dower.
 Widows may bequeath the crop of their lands.
 He is a bastard that is born before the marriage of his parents.

See also 
 List of English statutes
 Henry de Bracton

Notes

References

External links 

 List of repeals in the Republic of Ireland from the Irish Statute Book.

English laws
1230s in law
History of the London Borough of Merton
1235 in England
Political history of medieval England